The Nepal men's national volleyball team represents Nepal in international men's volleyball competitions and friendly matches. It is governed by the Nepal Volleyball Association.

Competition history

Asian Games 

  1978 – 15th
  1982 – 12th
  1986 – 12th
  2018 – 15th

AVC Central Zone Senior men's volleyball tournament 

  2015 – 4th
  2016 – 4th
  2017 – 
  2018 – 4th
  2019 – 5th

South Asian Games 

  2010 – 4th
  2016 – 5th
  2019 – 5th

Current roster 
Roster for the 2019 South Asian Games.

References 

National men's volleyball teams
Volleyball in Nepal
V